The Lakeland Prowlers were a minor professional ice hockey team located in Lakeland, Florida. They began play as the Lakeland Ice Warriors in the Sunshine Hockey League from 1992 to 1995. In 1995, the Sunshine Hockey League became the Southern Hockey League, and the team changed their name to the Lakeland Prowlers. Following the 1995–96 season both the Southern Hockey League and the team folded.

External links
Hockey League History

Defunct ice hockey teams in the United States
Ice hockey teams in Florida
Sports in Lakeland, Florida
Sunshine Hockey League teams
Southern Hockey League (1995–96) teams
1992 establishments in Florida
Ice hockey clubs established in 1992
Ice hockey clubs disestablished in 1996
1996 disestablishments in Florida